The Bishop Marty Rectory is a historic one-story building on the campus of Mount Marty College in Yankton, South Dakota. It was built in 1883 as a Roman Catholic rectory, and Bishop Martin Marty moved in the following year. It has been listed on the National Register of Historic Places since December 27, 1974.

References

	
National Register of Historic Places in Yankton County, South Dakota
Buildings and structures completed in 1883
1883 establishments in Dakota Territory
Clergy houses in the United States